is a passenger railway station located in the city of Yokosuka, Kanagawa Prefecture, Japan, operated by the private railway company Keikyū.

Lines
Uraga Station is the southern terminus of the Keikyū Main Line and is located 55.5 kilometers from the northern terminus of the line at Shinagawa Station in Tokyo.

Station layout
The station consists of a single elevated dead-headed island platform with the station building underneath.

Platforms

History
Uraga Station opened on April 1, 1930. The current station building was completed in 1957.

Keikyū introduced station numbering to its stations on 21 October 2010; Uraga Station was assigned station number KK64.

Passenger statistics
In fiscal 2019, the station was used by an average of 20,199 passengers daily. 

The passenger figures for previous years are as shown below.

Surrounding area
 Uraga Port
 Uraga Dock Company
Yokosuka Museum of Art
Kannonzaki

See also
 List of railway stations in Japan

References

External links

Railway stations in Kanagawa Prefecture
Railway stations in Japan opened in 1930
Keikyū Main Line
Railway stations in Yokosuka, Kanagawa